The following lists events that happened during 1948 in the Union of Soviet Socialist Republics.

Incumbents
 General Secretary of the Communist Party of the Soviet Union – Joseph Stalin
 Chairman of the Presidium of the Supreme Soviet of the Soviet Union – Nikolay Shvernik
 Chairman of the Council of Ministers of the Soviet Union – Joseph Stalin

Events
 Joseph Stalin sends the first advisers to China in an effort to repair the economic damage brought on by years of civil war.
 At the request of Mao Zedong, Joseph Stalin Sends railroad construction expert I.V. Kovalev with a team of 300 engineers and laborers to repair deteriorated or destroyed Manchurian railways.
 March 10 – Extreme restrictions are placed on German traffic from the Soviet Zone into Berlin.
 June 24 – The Soviets implement a total blockade of all ground and water transport into or out of Berlin. The blockade will last nearly a full year, ending May 12, 1949.

Births
 16 July - Mariia Stefiuk

Deaths
 25 October – Boris Fomin

See also
 1948 in fine arts of the Soviet Union
 List of Soviet films of 1948

References

 
1940s in the Soviet Union
Soviet Union
Soviet Union
Soviet Union